The Camparini Gioielli Cup was a professional tennis tournament played on outdoor red clay courts. It was part of the Association of Tennis Professionals (ATP) Challenger Tour and ITF Women's Circuit. It was held annually at the Circolo Tennis Reggio Emilia in Reggio Emilia, Italy, since 2003.
The French player Olivier Patience detains the record for victories, two, in singles.

Past finals

Men's singles

Men's doubles

Women's singles

Women's doubles

External links
Official website
ITF Search

 
ATP Challenger Tour
ITF Women's World Tennis Tour
Clay court tennis tournaments
2003 establishments in Italy
Recurring sporting events established in 2003
Recurring sporting events disestablished in 2011
Tennis tournaments in Italy
Defunct tennis tournaments in Italy